Angelo Rocca (1545, in Rocca, near Ancone – 8 April 1620, in Rome) was an Italian humanist, librarian and bishop, founder of the Angelica Library at Rome, afterwards accessible from 1604 as a public library.

Biography
Angelo Rocca is also known as Cameras Camerinus from the Augustinian monastery at Camerino. He studied at Perugia, Rome and Venice. In 1577 he graduated as a doctor in theology from Padua. After serving as superior-general of the Augustinian Monastery there from 1579, he became the head of the Vatican printing-office in 1585. In 1595 he was appointed sacristan in the papal chapel. In 1605 he was granted the office of titular Bishop of Tagaste in Numidia (the historic Augustinian diocese).

He was a researcher of history. He edited the printed version of the Vulgate Bible, (widely unknown before the printing press) and had it printed. During the editing he became accustomed to historic manuscripts stored in the Vatican – some of them not readily accessible until modern times. He (incorrectly) credited St. Jerome with the invention of Glagolitic. He was associated with the Vatican Press and Aldus Manutius the Younger.

His library was one of the most complete private collections in Rome, possessing over 130,000 volumes. Having been open to the public since 1604, it is considered the oldest public library in Europe along with the Biblioteca Ambrosiana in Milan.

Works
He edited the works of Egidio Colonna – 1581, and of Augustinus Triumphus – 1582.

His notable works include:
 
 
 Bibliothecæ theologicæ et scripturalis epitome – 1594
 De Sacrosancto Christi corpore romanis pontificibus iter conficientibus præferendo commentarius – 1599
 De canonizatione sanctorum commentarius – 1601
 De campanis – 1612

An incomplete collection of his works was published in Thesaurus pontificiarum sacrarumque antiquitatum necnon ritual praxium et cæremoniarium (Rome: 1719 and 1745).

References

External links
 

17th-century Italian Roman Catholic theologians
Augustinian friars
1545 births
1620 deaths
University of Perugia alumni
University of Padua alumni
16th-century Italian Roman Catholic theologians